The chestnut-bellied seed finch (Sporophila angolensis) is a species of bird in the family Thraupidae, but was until recently placed in Emberizidae.

It is found widely in shrubby and grassy areas in tropical and subtropical South America. It has been replaced west of the Andes (and in Central America) by the closely related thick-billed seed finch (S. funerea). The two have often been considered conspecific as the lesser seed-finch, using the older scientific name O. angolensis.

Taxonomy
The chestnut-bellied seed finch was formally described by the Swedish naturalist Carl Linnaeus in 1766 in the twelfth edition of his Systema Naturae under the binomial name Loxia angolensis. Linnaeus based his description on "The Black Gros-Beak" that had been described and illustrated in 1764 by the English naturalist George Edwards. Edwards's illustration was from a live bird belonging to the barrister Philip Carteret Webb. Edwards mistakenly believed that the bird had come from Angola. The chestnut-bellied seed finch does not occur there and the type locality is now designated as eastern Brazil.

The chestnut-bellied seed finch and the thick-billed seed finch were formerly considered conspecific and together had the English name "lesser seed-finch". Both species were formerly placed in the genus Oryzoborus but molecular phylogenetic studies found that Oryzoborus was embedded in Sporophila. The chestnut-bellied seed finch was therefore moved to Sporophila, a genus that had been introduced by the German ornithologist Jean Cabanis in 1844.

Two subspecies are recognised:
 S. a. torrida (Scopoli, 1769) – Trinidad, Tobago, east Colombia, Venezuela, the Guianas and north, west Amazonia
 S. a. angolensis (Linnaeus, 1766) – north Bolivia to east Brazil, Paraguay and northeast Argentina

References

Further reading

chestnut-bellied seed finch
Birds of the Amazon Basin
Birds of Colombia
Birds of Venezuela
Birds of Trinidad and Tobago
Birds of the Guianas
Birds of Brazil
Birds of Paraguay
Birds of the Caribbean
chestnut-bellied seed finch
chestnut-bellied seed finch
Taxonomy articles created by Polbot